Kinman Pond is a lake in Humboldt County, California, in the United States.

Kinman Pond (previously Kinmans Pond) was named for Seth Kinman, a pioneer settler.

See also
List of lakes in California

References

Lakes of California
Lakes of Humboldt County, California
Lakes of Northern California